Eichinger is a German family name:

 Bernd Eichinger (1949-2011), German film producer
 Gabriella Eichinger Ferro-Luzzi, Italian anthropologist and dravidologist
 Hans Eichinger, an Austrian bobsledder
 Julia Eichinger (born 1992), German freestyle skier
 Katja Eichinger (born 1971), German author and film producer
 Martin Eichinger (born 1949), an American sculptor
 Nina Eichinger (born 1981, Munich), a German TV presenter and actress
 Noel Eichinger (born 2001), German footballer
 Stefan Eichinger (born 1994), composer and disc jockey

See also 
 Aichinger (Austro-Bavarian form)
 Bernd-Eichinger-Platz, a square in the Munich district of Maxvorstadt

German-language surnames